Catello Amarante (born 15 August 1979 in Naples) is an Italian rower, who won the bronze medal at the 2004 Summer Olympics in the men's lightweight coxless four.

References

External links
 
 

1979 births
Living people
Italian male rowers
Olympic rowers of Italy
Rowers at the 2000 Summer Olympics
Rowers at the 2004 Summer Olympics
Rowers at the 2008 Summer Olympics
Olympic bronze medalists for Italy
Rowers from Naples
Olympic medalists in rowing
Medalists at the 2004 Summer Olympics
World Rowing Championships medalists for Italy
Mediterranean Games silver medalists for Italy
Competitors at the 2005 Mediterranean Games
Mediterranean Games medalists in rowing
Rowers of Fiamme Gialle
European Rowing Championships medalists